Pearl Zane Grey (January 31, 1872 – October 23, 1939) was an American author and dentist. He is known for his popular adventure novels and stories associated with the Western genre in literature and the arts; he idealized the American frontier. Riders of the Purple Sage (1912) was his best-selling book.

In addition to the success of his printed works, his books have second lives and continuing influence adapted for films and television. His novels and short stories were adapted into 112 films, two television episodes, and a television series, Dick Powell's Zane Grey Theatre.

Biography

Early life 
Pearl Zane Grey was born January 31, 1872, in Zanesville, Ohio. His birth name may have originated from newspaper descriptions of Queen Victoria's mourning clothes as "pearl grey". He was the fourth of five children born to Alice "Allie" Josephine Zane, whose English Quaker immigrant ancestor Robert Zane came to the American colonies in 1673, and her husband, Lewis M. Gray, a dentist. His family changed the spelling of their last name to "Grey" after his birth. Grey later dropped "Pearl" and used "Zane" as his first name.

Grey grew up in Zanesville, a city founded by his paternal grandfather Benjamin Zane's brother-in-law, John McIntire (husband of Sarah Zane), who had been given the land by Grey's maternal great-grandfather, Ebenezer Zane, an American Revolutionary War patriot.

Both Grey and his brother Romer were active and athletic boys who were enthusiastic baseball players and fishermen. From an early age, he was intrigued by history. Soon, he developed an interest in writing. His early interests contributed to his later writing success. For example, his knowledge of history informed his first three novels, which recounted the heroism of ancestors who fought in the American Revolutionary War.

As a child, Grey frequently engaged in violent brawls, probably related to his father's punishing him with severe beatings. Though irascible and antisocial like his father, Grey was supported by a loving mother and found a father substitute. Muddy Miser was an old man who approved of Grey's love of fishing and writing, and who talked about the advantages of an unconventional life. Despite warnings by Grey's father to steer clear of Miser, the boy spent much time during five formative years in the company of the old man.

Grey was an avid reader of adventure stories such as Robinson Crusoe and the Leatherstocking Tales, as well as dime novels featuring Buffalo Bill and Deadwood Dick. He was enthralled by and crudely copied the great illustrators Howard Pyle and Frederic Remington. He was particularly impressed with Our Western Border, a history of the Ohio frontier that likely inspired his earliest novels. Grey wrote his first story, Jim of the Cave, when he was fifteen. His father tore it to shreds and beat him.

Because of the shame he felt as the result of a severe financial setback in 1889 due to a poor investment, Lewis Grey moved his family from Zanesville and started again in Columbus, Ohio. While his father struggled to re-establish his dental practice, Grey made rural house calls and performed basic extractions, which his father had taught him. The younger Grey practiced until the state board intervened. His brother Romer earned money by driving a delivery wagon. Grey also worked as a part-time usher in a theater and played summer baseball for the Columbus Capitols, with aspirations of becoming a major leaguer. Eventually, Grey was spotted by a baseball scout and received offers from many colleges. Romer also attracted scouts' attention and went on to have a professional baseball career.

University of Pennsylvania and baseball 

Grey chose the University of Pennsylvania on a baseball scholarship, where he studied dentistry and joined Sigma Nu fraternity; he graduated in 1896. When he arrived at Penn, he had to prove himself worthy of a scholarship before receiving it. He rose to the occasion by coming in to pitch against the Riverton club, pitching five scoreless innings and producing a double in the tenth which contributed to the win. The Ivy League was highly competitive and an excellent training ground for future pro baseball players. Grey was a solid hitter and an excellent pitcher who relied on a sharply dropping curveball. When the distance from the pitcher's mound to the plate was lengthened by ten feet in 1894 (primarily to reduce the dominance of Cy Young's pitching), the effectiveness of Grey's pitching suffered. He was re-positioned to the outfield. The short, wiry baseball player remained a campus hero on the strength of his timely hitting.

He was an indifferent scholar, barely achieving a minimum average. Outside class, he spent his time on baseball, swimming, and creative writing, especially poetry. His shy nature and his teetotaling set him apart from other students, and he socialized little. Grey struggled with the idea of becoming a writer or baseball player for his career, but unhappily concluded that dentistry was the practical choice.

During a summer break, while playing "summer nines" in Delphos, Ohio, Grey was charged with, and quietly settled, a paternity suit.  His father paid the $133.40 cost and Grey resumed playing summer baseball.  He concealed the episode when he returned to Penn.

Grey went on to play minor league baseball with several teams, including the Newark, New Jersey Colts in 1898 and also with the Orange Athletic Club for several years. His brother Romer Carl "Reddy" Grey (known as "R.C." to his family) did better and played professionally in the minor leagues. Zane Grey and Romer Grey played together as teammates for the 1895 Findlay Sluggers of the Interstate League. Romer played a single major league game in 1903 for the Pittsburgh Pirates.

Dentistry 
After graduating, Grey established his practice in New York City under the name of Dr. Zane Grey in 1896.  It was a competitive area but he wanted to be close to publishers.  He began to write in the evening to offset the tedium of his dental practice.  He struggled financially and emotionally. Grey was a natural writer but his early efforts were stiff and grammatically weak. Whenever possible, he played baseball with the Orange Athletic Club in New Jersey, a team of former collegiate players that was one of the best amateur teams in the country.

Grey often went camping with his brother R.C. in Lackawaxen, Pennsylvania, where they fished in the upper Delaware River.  When canoeing in 1900, Grey met seventeen-year-old Lina Roth, better known as "Dolly." Dolly came from a family of physicians and was studying to be a schoolteacher.

Marriage and family 

After a passionate and intense courtship marked by frequent quarrels, Grey and Dolly married five years later in 1905.  Grey suffered bouts of depression, anger, and mood swings, which affected him most of his life. As he described it,  "A hyena lying in ambush—that is my black spell! I conquered one mood only to fall prey to the next ... I wandered about like a lost soul or a man who was conscious of imminent death."

During his courtship of Dolly, Grey still saw previous girlfriends and warned her frankly,

But I love to be free.  I cannot change my spots.  The ordinary man is satisfied with a moderate income, a home, wife, children, and all that. ... But I am a million miles from being that kind of man and no amount of trying will ever do any good ... I shall never lose the spirit of my interest in women.

After they married in 1905, Dolly gave up her teaching career.  They moved to a farmhouse at the confluence of the Lackawaxen and Delaware rivers, in Lackawaxen, Pennsylvania, where Grey's mother and sister joined them. (This house, now preserved and operated as the Zane Grey Museum, is listed on the National Register of Historic Places.) Grey finally ceased his dental practice to work full-time on his nascent literary pursuits.  Dolly's inheritance provided an initial financial cushion.

Early writing career 

While Dolly managed Grey's career and raised their three children, including son Romer Zane Grey, over the next two decades Grey often spent months away from the family.  He fished, wrote, and spent time with his many mistresses. While Dolly knew of his behavior, she seemed to view it as his handicap rather than a choice. Throughout their life together, he highly valued her management of his career and their family, and her solid emotional support. In addition to her considerable editorial skills, she had good business sense and handled all his contract negotiations with publishers, agents, and movie studios. All his income was split fifty-fifty with her; from her "share," she covered all family expenses. Their considerable correspondence shows evidence of his lasting love for her despite his infidelities and personal emotional turmoil.

The Greys moved to California in 1918. In 1920 they settled in Altadena, California, at a home later known as the '"Zane Grey Estate"'. In Altadena Grey also spent time with his mistress Brenda Montenegro. The two met while hiking Eaton Canyon. Of her he wrote,

I saw her flowing raven mane against the rocks of the canyon. I have seen the red skin of the Navajo, and the olive of the Spaniards, but her ... her skin looked as if her Creator had in that instant molded her just for me. I thought it was an apparition. She seemed to be the embodiment of the West I portray in my books, open and wild. Grey summed up his feelings for the city: "In Altadena, I have found those qualities that make life worth living."

With the help of Dolly's proofreading and copy editing, Grey gradually improved his writing. His first magazine article, "A Day on the Delaware," a human-interest story about a Grey brothers' fishing expedition, was published in the May 1902 issue of Recreation magazine. Elated at selling the article, Grey offered reprints to patients in his waiting room. In writing, Grey found temporary escape from the harshness of his life and his demons. "Realism is death to me. I cannot stand life as it is." By this time, he had given up baseball.

Grey read Owen Wister's great Western novel The Virginian. After studying its style and structure in detail, he decided to write a full-length work. Grey had difficulties in writing his first novel, Betty Zane (1903). When it was rejected by Harper & Brothers, he lapsed into despair. The novel dramatized the heroism of an ancestor, Betty Zane who had saved Fort Henry. He self-published it, perhaps with funds provided by his wife Dolly or his brother R. C.'s wealthy girlfriend Reba Smith. From the beginning, vivid description was the strongest aspect of his writing.

After attending a lecture in New York in 1907 at the Camp-Fire Club by Charles Jesse "Buffalo" Jones, western hunter and guide who had co-founded Garden City, Kansas, Grey arranged for a mountain lion-hunting trip to the North Rim of the Grand Canyon. He brought along a camera to document his trips and prove his adventures.  He also began the habit of taking copious notes, not only of scenery and activities but of dialogue. His first two trips were arduous, but Grey learned much from his companions on these adventures. He gained the confidence to write convincingly about the American West, its characters, and its landscape. Treacherous river crossings, unpredictable beasts, bone-chilling cold, searing heat, parching thirst, bad water, irascible tempers, and heroic cooperation all became real to him. He wrote, "Surely, of all the gifts that have come to me from contact with the West, this one of sheer love of wildness, beauty, color, grandeur, has been the greatest, the most significant for my work."

Upon returning home in 1909, Grey wrote a new novel, The Last of the Plainsmen, describing the adventures of Buffalo Jones. Harper's editor Ripley Hitchcock rejected it, the fourth work in a row. He told Grey, "I do not see anything in this to convince me you can write either narrative or fiction." Grey wrote dejectedly,

I don't know which way to turn. I cannot decide what to write next. That which I desire to write does not seem to be what the editors want ... I am full of stories and zeal and fire ... yet I am inhibited by doubt, by fear that my feeling for life is false.

The book was later published by the American magazine, Outing, which provided Grey some satisfaction. Grey next wrote a series of magazine articles and juvenile novels.

With the birth of his first child pending, Grey felt compelled to complete his next novel, The Heritage of the Desert. He wrote it in four months in 1910. It quickly became a bestseller. Grey took his next work to Hitchcock again; this time Harper published his work, a historical romance in which Mormon characters were of central importance. Grey continued to write popular novels about Manifest Destiny, the conquest of the Old West, and the behavior of men in elemental conditions.

Two years later Grey produced his best-known book, Riders of the Purple Sage (1912), his all-time best-seller, and one of the most successful Western novels in history. Hitchcock rejected it, but Grey took his manuscript directly to the vice president of Harper, who accepted it. The novel had a sequel (The Rainbow Trail in 1915), and was filmed five times (in 1918, 1925, 1931, 1941, and 1996; but in later film versions the villains are corrupt judges or lawyers, not Mormon polygamists).

Later career 

Zane Grey had become a household name; thereafter Harper eagerly received all his manuscripts. Other publishers caught on to the commercial potential of the Western novel. Max Brand and Ernest Haycox were among the most notable of other writers of Westerns. Grey's publishers paired his novels with some of the best illustrators of the time, including N. C. Wyeth, Frank Schoonover, Douglas Duer, W. Herbert Dunton, W. H. D. Koerner, and Charles Russell.

Grey had the time and money to engage in his first and greatest passion: fishing. From 1918 until 1932, he was a regular contributor to Outdoor Life magazine. As one of its first celebrity writers, he began to popularize big-game fishing. Several times he went deep-sea fishing in Florida to relax and to write in solitude. Although he commented that "the sea, from which all life springs, has been equally with the desert my teacher and religion", Grey was unable to write a great sea novel. He felt the sea soothed his moods, reduced his depressions, and gained him the opportunity to harvest deeper thoughts:

Over the years, Grey spent part of his time traveling and the rest of the year writing novels and articles. Unlike writers who could write every day, Grey would have dry spells and then sudden bursts of energy, in which he could write as much as 100,000 words in a month. He encountered fans in most places. He visited the Rogue River in Oregon in 1919 for a fishing expedition, and fell in love with it. He returned in the 1920s, eventually setting up a cabin on the lower Rogue River. Grey captured the river's essence in two books: Tales of Freshwater Fishing and Rogue River Feud. Other excursions took him to Washington state and Wyoming.

From 1923 to 1930, he spent a few weeks a year at his cabin on the Mogollon Rim, in Central Arizona.  After years of abandonment and decay, the cabin was restored in 1966 by Bill Goettl, a Phoenix air conditioning magnate. He opened it to the public as a free-of-charge museum. The Dude Fire destroyed the cabin in 1990. It was later reconstructed 25 miles away in the town of Payson.

During the 1930s, Grey continued to write, but the Great Depression hurt the publishing industry.  His sales fell off, and he found it more difficult to sell serializations. He had avoided making investments that would have been affected by the stock market crash of 1929, and continued to earn royalty income, so he did better than many financially. Nearly half of the film adaptations of his novels were made in the 1930s.

From 1925 to his death in 1939, Grey traveled more and further from his family. He became interested in exploring unspoiled lands, particularly the islands of the South Pacific, New Zealand and Australia. He thought Arizona was beginning to be overrun by tourists and speculators. Near the end of his life, Grey looked into the future and wrote:

Reception by critics 
The more books Grey sold, the more the established critics, such as Heywood Broun and Burton Rascoe, attacked him. They claimed his depictions of the West were too fanciful, too violent, and not faithful to the moral realities of the frontier.  They thought his characters unrealistic and much larger-than-life.  Broun stated that "the substance of any two Zane Grey books could be written upon the back of a postage stamp."

T. K. Whipple praised a typical Grey novel as a modern version of the ancient Beowulf saga, "a battle of passions with one another and with the will, a struggle of love and hate, or remorse and revenge, of blood, lust, honor, friendship, anger, grief—all of a grand scale and all incalculable and mysterious." But he also criticized Grey's writing: "His style, for example, has the stiffness which comes from an imperfect mastery of the medium.  It lacks fluency and facility."

Grey based his work in his own varied first-hand experience, supported by careful note-taking, and considerable research. Despite his great popular success and fortune, Grey read the reviews and sometimes became paralyzed by negative emotions after critical ones.

In 1923, a reviewer said Grey's "moral ideas ... [were] decidedly askew." Grey reacted with a 20-page treatise, "My Answer to the Critics." He defended his intentions to produce great literature in the setting of the Old West. He suggested that critics should ask his readers what they think of his books, and noted actor and fan John Barrymore as an example. Dolly warned him against publishing the treatise, and he retreated from a public confrontation.

His novel The Vanishing American (1925), first serialized in The Ladies' Home Journal in 1922, prompted a heated debate. People recognized its Navajo hero as patterned after Jim Thorpe, a great Native American athlete. Grey portrayed the struggle of the Navajo to preserve their identity and culture against corrupting influences of the white government and of missionaries. This viewpoint enraged religious groups. Grey contended, "I have studied the Navaho Indians for 12 years. I know their wrongs. The missionaries sent out there are almost everyone mean, vicious, weak, immoral, useless men." To have the book published, Grey agreed to some structural changes. With this book, Grey completed the most productive period of his writing career, having laid out most major themes, character types, and settings.

His Wanderer of the Wasteland is a thinly disguised autobiography. One of his books, "Tales of the Angler's El Dorado, New Zealand," helped establish the Bay of Islands in New Zealand as a premier game fishing area.  Several of his later writings (e.g., Rangle River) were based in Australia.

Fishing 

Grey co-founded the "Porpoise Club" with his friend, Robert H. Davis of Munsey's Magazine, to popularize the sport of hunting of dolphins and porpoises.  They made their first catch off Seabright, New Jersey, on September 21, 1912, where they harpooned and reeled in a bottlenose dolphin.

Grey's son Loren claims in the introduction to Tales of Tahitian Waters that Zane Grey fished on average 300 days a year through his adult life. Grey and his brother R.C. were frequent visitors to Long Key, Florida, where they helped to establish the Long Key Fishing Club, built by Henry Morrison Flagler. Zane Grey was its president from 1917 to 1920. He pioneered the fishing of Boohoo fish (sailfish). Zane Grey Creek was named for him.

Grey indulged his interest in fishing with visits to Australia and New Zealand. He first visited New Zealand in 1926 and caught several large fish of great variety, including a mako shark, a ferocious fighter which presented a new challenge.  Grey established a base at Otehei Bay, Urupukapuka Island in the Bay of Islands, which became a destination for the rich and famous. He wrote many articles in international sporting magazines highlighting the uniqueness of New Zealand fishing, which has produced heavy-tackle world records for the major billfish, striped marlin, black marlin, blue marlin and broadbill.  A lodge and camp were established at Otehei Bay in 1927 called the Zane Grey Sporting Club. He held numerous world records during this time and invented the teaser, a hookless bait that is still used today to attract fish. Grey made three additional fishing trips to New Zealand. The second was January to April 1927, the third December 1928 to March 1929, and the last from December 1932 to February 1933.

Grey fished out of Wedgeport, Nova Scotia, for many summers.

Grey also helped establish deep-sea sport fishing in New South Wales, Australia, particularly in Bermagui, which is famous for marlin fishing. Patron of the Bermagui Sport Fishing Association for 1936 and 1937, Grey set a number of world records, and wrote of his experiences in his book An American Angler in Australia.

From 1928 on, Grey was a frequent visitor to Tahiti. He fished the surrounding waters several months at a time and maintained a permanent fishing camp at Vairao.

Grey had built a getaway home in Santa Catalina Island, California, which still serves as the Zane Grey Pueblo Hotel. He served as president of Catalina's exclusive fishing club, the Tuna Club of Avalon.

Death 
Zane Grey died of heart failure on October 23, 1939, aged 67 at his home in Altadena, California. He was interred at the Lackawaxen and Union Cemetery, Lackawaxen, Pennsylvania.

Legacy

Literary works 
Grey became one of the first millionaire authors.

Zane Grey was a major force in shaping the myths of the Old West; his books and stories were adapted into other media, such as film and TV productions. He was the author of more than 90 books, some published posthumously or based on serials originally published in magazines. His total book sales exceed 40 million.

Grey wrote not only Westerns, but two hunting books, six children's books, three baseball books, and eight fishing books. Many of them became bestsellers.  It is estimated that he wrote more than nine million words in his career. From 1917 to 1926, Grey was in the top ten best-seller list nine times, which required sales of more than 100,000 copies each time. Even after his death, Harper had a stockpile of his manuscripts and continued to publish a new title each year until 1963. During the 1940s and afterward, as Grey's books were reprinted as paperbacks, his sales exploded.

Erle Stanley Gardner, prolific author of mystery novels and the Perry Mason series, said of Grey:

Grey was President Dwight D. Eisenhower's favorite writer.

Books published after his death 
A 1950 newspaper article stated that Romer Zane Grey and his mother had completed work on Cahuenga Pass, one of Zane Grey's unfinished novels, and that a film treatment would be prepared. In 1953 columnist Hedda Hopper reported that a proposed film project, Thirty Thousand on the Hoof, was based on one of the six unfinished Grey novels that had been completed by his wife.

Hollywood and other media 

Grey started his association with Hollywood when William Fox bought the rights to Riders of the Purple Sage for $2,500 in 1916. The ascending arc of Grey's career matched that of the motion picture industry.  It eagerly adapted Western stories to the screen practically from its inception, with Bronco Billy Anderson becoming the first major western star. Legendary director John Ford was then a young stage hand and Tom Mix, who had been a real cowhand, was defining the persona of the film cowboy. The Grey family moved to California to be closer to the film industry and to enable Grey to fish in the Pacific.

After his first two books were adapted to the screen, Grey formed his own motion picture company. This enabled him to control production values and faithfulness to his books.  After seven films he sold his company to Jesse Lasky who was a partner of the founder of Paramount Pictures. Paramount made a number of movies based on Grey's writings and hired him as advisor. Many of his films were shot at locations described in his books.

In 1936 Grey appeared as himself in a feature film shot in Australia, White Death (1936).  At the same time he provided a story that was filmed as Rangle River (1936).

Grey became disenchanted by the commercial exploitation and copyright infringement of his works.  He felt his stories and characters were diluted by being adapted to film. Nearly 50 of his novels were converted into more than 100 Western movies.  Shortly after Grey's death, the success of Fritz Lang's Western Union (1941), a film based on one of his books, helped bring about a resurgence in Hollywood westerns.  Its costars were Randolph Scott and Robert Young.  The period of the 1940s and 1950s included the great works of John Ford, who successfully used the settings of Grey's novels in Arizona and Utah.

The success of Grey's The Lone Star Ranger (the novel was adapted into four movies: 1914, 1919, 1930 and 1942, and a comic book in 1949) and King of the Royal Mounted (popular as a series of Big Little Books and comics, later turned into a 1936 film and three film serials) inspired two radio series by George Trendle (WXYZ, Detroit).  Later these were adapted again for television, forming the series The Lone Ranger and Challenge of the Yukon (Sgt. Preston of the Yukon on TV).  More of Grey's work was featured in adapted form on the Zane Grey Show, which ran on the Mutual Broadcasting System for five months in the 1940s, and the "Zane Grey Western Theatre," which had a five-year run of 145 episodes.

Many famous actors got their start in films based on Zane Grey books.  They included Gary Cooper, Randolph Scott, William Powell, Wallace Beery, Richard Arlen, Buster Crabbe, Shirley Temple, and Fay Wray. Victor Fleming, later director of  Gone with the Wind, and Henry Hathaway, who later directed True Grit, both learned their craft on Grey films.

Honors and awards 
 The National Park Service maintains his former home in Lackawaxen, Pennsylvania as the Zane Grey Museum, a part of the Upper Delaware Scenic and Recreational River area.
 Zanesville, Ohio, has a museum named in his honor, the National Road-Zane Grey Museum.
 Zane Grey Terrace, a small residential street in the hillsides of Altadena, is named in his honor.
 The Zane Grey Tourist Park in Bermagui, Australia.
 "Zane Greys'" a headland at the western end of Matapaua Bay, New Zealand.
 The Zane Grey Continuation School is located adjacent to Reseda High School in Reseda, Los Angeles, California.
 Zane Grey room is located at the Sigma Nu – Beta Rho house in honor of where Zane Grey lived for part of his time at the University of Pennsylvania.
 Wilder Ranch State Park near Santa Cruz, California named the Zane Grey Trail after the author.  Zane Grey briefly worked as a ranch hand at Wilder Ranch.
  Zane Grey Roadless Area (58,000 acres), along the Rogue River, is managed by the Bureau of Land Management (BLM) in Oregon, USA.
 In 1977, he was inducted into the Hall of Great Westerners of the National Cowboy & Western Heritage Museum.

Works 
Works published posthumously after 1939 include original novels, sequels to earlier novels, and compilations and revisions of previously published novels. All western works were translated from English into Spanish by Editorial Juventud in 1959 for CLASICOS Y MODERNOS collection.

Books

Films 
Between 1911 and 1996, 112 films were adapted from the novels and stories of Zane Grey. In addition, three television series included episodes adapted from his work, including Dick Powell's Zane Grey Theatre (1956–58).

 Fighting Blood (1911 short) (Watch) novel
 Graft (1915) story
 The Border Legion (1918) novel
 Riders of the Purple Sage (1918) novel
 The Rainbow Trail (1918) story
 The Light of the Western Stars (1918) novel
 The Lone Star Ranger (1919) novel
 The Last of the Duanes (1919) story
 Desert Gold (1919)
 Riders of the Dawn (1920) novel The Desert of Wheat
 Days of Daring (1920 short)  novel In the Days of Thundering Herd
 The U.P. Trail (1920) novel
 Man of the Forest (1921) novel
 The Mysterious Rider (1921) novel
 The Last Trail (1921) novel
 When Romance Rides (1922) novel Wildfire
 Golden Dreams (1922)  story
 To the Last Man (1923) novel
 The Lone Star Ranger (1923) novel
 The Call of the Canyon (1923) story
 Heritage of the Desert (1924) novel
 Wanderer of the Wasteland (1924) novel
 The Border Legion (1924) novel
 The Last of the Duanes (1924) story
 The Thundering Herd (1925) novel
 Riders of the Purple Sage (1925) (Watch) novel
 Code of the West (1925) novel
 The Rainbow Trail (1925) story
 The Light of Western Stars (1925) novel
 Wild Horse Mesa (1925) novel
 The Vanishing American (1925) novel
 Desert Gold (1926) novel
 Born to the West (1926) story
 Forlorn River (1926) novel
 Man of the Forest (1926) novel
 The Last Trail (1927) novel
 The Mysterious Rider (1927) novel
 Drums of the Desert (1927) novel Captives of the Desert
 Lightning (1927) story
 Nevada (1927) novel
 Open Range (1927) novel Valley of Wild Horses
 Under the Tonto Rim (1928) novel
 The Vanishing Pioneer (1928) novel Golden Dreams
 The Water Hole (1928) story
 Avalanche (1928) novel
 Sunset Pass (1929) novel
 Stairs of Sand (1929) novel
 The Lone Star Ranger (1930) novel
 The Light of Western Stars (1930) novel
 The Border Legion (1930) novel
 The Last of the Duanes (1930) novel
 El último de los Vargas (1930)  novel
 Fighting Caravans (1931) novel Wagon Wheels
 Riders of the Purple Sage (1931) novel
 The Rainbow Trail (1932) story
 Heritage of the Desert (1932) story
 The Golden West (1932) story
 Wild Horse Mesa

 End of the Trail (1932) story
 Robbers' Roost (1932) novel
 The Woman Accused (1933) story Liberty Magazine along with 7 other authors
 Smoke Lightning (1933) novel Canyon Walls
 The Thundering Herd (1933) story
 Under the Tonto Rim (1933) novel The Bee Hunter
 Sunset Pass (1933) novel
 Life in the Raw (1933) novel
 The Last Trail (1933) novel
 Man of the Forest (1933) novel
 To the Last Man (1933) story
 The Last Round-Up (1934) novel The Border Legion
 Wagon Wheels (1934) novel Fighting Caravans
 The Dude Ranger (1934) story
 West of the Pecos (1934) novel
 Home on the Range (1935) novel Code of the West
 Rocky Mountain Mystery (1935) novel Golden Dreams
 Wanderer of the Wasteland (1935) novel
 Thunder Mountain (1935) novel
 Nevada (1935) novel
 Drift Fence (1936) novel
 Desert Gold (1936) novel
 The Arizona Raiders (1936) novel Raiders of Spanish Peaks
 King of the Royal Mounted (1936) story
 End of the Trail (1936) novel Outlaws of Palouse
 Arizona Mahoney (1936) novel Stairs of Sand
 Rangle River (1936) novel
 Forlorn River (1937) novel
 Roll Along, Cowboy (1937) novel The Dude Ranger
 Thunder Trail (1937) story "Arizona Ames"
 Born to the West (1937) novel
 The Mysterious Rider (1938) characters
 Heritage of the Desert (1939) novel
 The Light of Western Stars (1940) novel
 Knights of the Range (1940) story
 The Border Legion (1940) novel
 Western Union (1941) novel
 Last of the Duanes (1941) story
 Riders of the Purple Sage (1941) novel
 Lone Star Ranger (1942) novel
 Nevada (1944) novel
 Wanderer of the Wasteland (1945) novel
 West of the Pecos (1945) novel
 Sunset Pass (1946) novel
 Code of the West (1947) novel
 Thunder Mountain (1947) novel
 Gunfighters (1947) novel Twin Sombreros
 Under the Tonto Rim (1947) novel
 Wild Horse Mesa
 Red Canyon (1949) novel Wildfire
 Robbers' Roost (1955) story
 The Vanishing American (1955) novel
 Chevron Hall of Stars (1956, TV) story "The Lone Hand"
 Schlitz Playhouse of Stars (1956 TV) story "A Tale of Wells Fargo"
 The Maverick Queen (1956) novel
 Dick Powell's Zane Grey Theatre (1956–58 TV) stories for 6 episodes
 Riders of the Purple Sage (1996, TV film) novel

See also

Bret Harte
Rex Beach
James Oliver Curwood
Jack London

References

Bibliography

Further reading

External links 

Sources
 
 
 
 
 Works by Zane Grey at Freeread
 

Archival Materials
 Zane Grey papers, MSS 8316 at L. Tom Perry Special Collections, Brigham Young University
 Joe Wheeler collection on Zane Grey, MSS 7641 at L. Tom Perry Special Collections, Brigham Young University
 Guide to Zane Grey's papers at the University of Oregon

Zane Grey Collection. Yale Collection of Western Americana, Beinecke RareBook and Manuscript Library.

Other

 Western American Literature Journal: Zane Grey
 Zane Grey's West Society
 Zane Grey Cabin
 Zane Grey Museum in Lackawaxen, Pennsylvania
 National Road/Zane Grey Museum Norwich, Ohio
 King of the Royal Mounted BLBs and Comics
 Zane Grey biography at Ohio History Central
 
 
 Zane Grey Incorporated
 

1872 births
1939 deaths
20th-century American male writers
20th-century American novelists
American Western (genre) novelists
American dentists
American film studio executives
American fishers
American male novelists
American people of English descent
Angling writers
Film producers from Ohio
Findlay Sluggers players
Novelists from Ohio
Penn Quakers baseball players
People from Zanesville, Ohio
University of Pennsylvania School of Dental Medicine alumni